Lithophane nasar is a species of cutworm or dart moth in the family Noctuidae. It is found in North America.

The MONA or Hodges number for Lithophane nasar is 9926.

References

Further reading

 
 
 

nasar
Articles created by Qbugbot
Moths described in 1909